A Maid of the Silver Sea is a 1922 British silent drama film directed by Guy Newall and starring Newall, Ivy Duke and Cameron Carr. It is an adaptation of the 1910 novel of the same name by John Oxenham.

Plot
The Bioscope provided the following synopsis of the film:
To a small island off the French coast comes Stephen Gard, a young Englishman, in charge of a gang of Cornish miners, whose presence arouses the hostility of the natives. Especially resentful is Tom Hamon, the bullying brother of Nance, in whom Stephen finds a friend. immediately after a fight one night with Stephen, Tom is found dead at the foot of a steep cliff. Although his assertion of innocence is accepted by the local magistrate, the fisher-folk, goaded on by the dead man's wife, believe that Stephen murdered Tom and threaten to lynch him. Hearing of their intentions, Nance rows Stephen to a lonely rock whither she brings him food. The angry fisher-folk discover Stephen's hiding-place, however, and, landing on the island, blockade his cavern. Meanwhile, another fisherman is killed on the spot where Tom died. Determined to solve the mystery, Nance visits the place with the magistrate and discovers that both men were killed by the kick of a wild pony, which attacks her. Hastening to Stephen's island, she is able to prove his innocence and secure his release.

Cast
 Ivy Duke as Nance Hamon  
 Guy Newall as Stephen Gard  
 A. Bromley Davenport as Old Tom Hamon  
 Cameron Carr as Tom Hamon  
 Lilian Cavanagh as Julie  
 Charles Evemy as Berne Hamon  
 Winifred Sadler as Mrs. Hamon  
 Percy Morrish as Peter Mauger  
 Marie Gerald as Grannie  
 Charles Wood as Seneschal 
 Norman Loring as Doctor

Reception
According to The Biograph, "charming rocky coast scenes and clever Breton type studies are the most noteworthy features of this version of John Oxenham's novel, adapted and directed by Guy Newall. The story opens well, but tails off rather weakly. However, the production is varied in interest and, as a whole, makes a fairly satisfactory entertainment of a class which is always welcome." According to the reviewer, "Guy Newall's direction of individual scenes is always intelligent and artistic, and often original. The photography by Hal Young is generally excellent, especially in the coast scenes, a few of which are real gems of screen art," and the acting good, but "the solution of the 'murder' mystery is in the nature of an anti-climax, owing largely to the unconvincing and altogether inadequate staging of the wild pony's attack upon the heroine."

References

Bibliography
 Goble, Alan. The Complete Index to Literary Sources in Film. Walter de Gruyter, 1999.
 Low, Rachael. The History of the British Film 1918-1929. George Allen & Unwin, 1971.

External links
 

1922 films
1922 drama films
British drama films
British silent feature films
Films directed by Guy Newall
Films based on British novels
British black-and-white films
1920s English-language films
1920s British films
Silent drama films